Ulf Eklund (born 23 April 1951) is a Swedish actor. He has appeared in more than 25 films and television shows since 1980.

Selected filmography

 Underground Secrets (1991)
 Beck – Spår i mörker (1997)
 S:t Mikael: Traumaenheten (1998-1999)
 Goda grannar (1987–1988)
 Rederiet (1992–2002)

References

External links

1951 births
Living people
20th-century Swedish male actors
21st-century Swedish male actors
Swedish male film actors
Swedish male television actors
Male actors from Stockholm